The Xiapu dialect (Eastern Min: 霞浦話; Foochow Romanized: Hà-puō-uâ) is a dialect of Eastern Min Chinese spoken in Xiapu, Ningde in northeastern Fujian province of China.

Phonology 
The Xiapu dialect has 15 initials, 43 rimes and 7 tones.

Initials

Rimes

Tones

Initial assimilation 
The two-syllable initial assimilation rules are shown in the table below:

Tone sandhi 
The two-syllable tonal sandhi rules are shown in the table below:

References 

Eastern Min